George Williams (by 1521 – 1556) was an English politician.

He was a Member (MP) of the Parliament of England for Grantham in 1555.

References

1556 deaths
English MPs 1555
Year of birth uncertain